Bertrand Ice Piedmont is an ice piedmont about  long and from  wide, lying between Rymill Bay and Mikkelsen Bay on the Fallières Coast of Graham Land.

Bertrand Ice Piedmont is bounded on the southeast side by Pavie Ridge and on the northeast side by Black Thumb. It was surveyed in 1936 by the British Graham Land Expedition under John Riddoch Rymill, and resurveyed in 1948–1949 by the Falkland Islands Dependencies Survey. It was named by the UK Antarctic Place-names Committee after Kenneth J. Bertrand (1910–1978), Professor of Geography, at The Catholic University of America, Washington, D.C. A geomorphologist and Antarctic historian, Bertrand was a member of the United States Advisory Committee on Antarctic Names (1947–1973), and chairman 1962–1973. His Americans in Antarctica, 1775–1948, published in 1971, is the most extensive and authoritative account of American involvement in the Antarctic.

See also 
 List of glaciers

Further reading 
 Defense Mapping Agency  1992, Sailing Directions (planning Guide) and (enroute) for Antarctica, P 152
 Jane G. Ferrigno, Alison J. Cook, Amy M. Mathie, Richard S. Williams, Jr., Charles Swithinbank, Kevin M. Foley, Adrian J. Fox, Janet W. Thomson, and Jörn Sievers, Coastal-Change and Glaciological Map of the Larsen Ice Shelf Area, Antarctica: 1940–2005, USGS
 Peter Gibbs, A memoir of time in the Antarctic 1956-59

External links 

 Bertrand Ice Piedmont on USGS website
 Bertrand Ice Piedmont on AADC website
 Bertrand Ice Piedmont on SCAR website

References 

Ice piedmonts of Graham Land
Fallières Coast